Vanda ampullacea is a perennial epiphytic orchid found in southeast Asia from Nepal to China (southern Yunnan) and India, including the eastern Himalayas. It has had various classifications, initially called Aerides ampullacea by William Roxburgh when it was first described in 1814. It was most recently reclassified in 2012 during a taxonomic revision of Vanda. In 1868, one if its cultivars received a First Class Certificate from the Royal Horticultural Society.

References 

ampullaceum
Orchids of Assam
Orchids of India
Orchids of Myanmar
Orchids of China
Orchids of Laos
Orchids of Nepal
Orchids of Thailand
Orchids of Vietnam
Flora of Bangladesh
Flora of Bhutan
Flora of India (region)
Flora of China
Flora of Laos
Flora of Nepal
Flora of Myanmar
Flora of Vietnam
Flora of Thailand
Plants described in 1832